Palaeobalistum is an extinct genus of prehistoric ray-finned fish which ranged from the Cretaceous to Eocene periods.

Etymology 
The Latin genus name derives from a Greek word meaning "thick tooth".

Species 
The following species have been described:
 Palaeobalistum dossantosi  Maury, 1930
 Palaeobalistum flavellatum Cope, 1886
 Palaeobalistum geiseri Thurmond, 1974
 Palaeobalistum goedeli Heckel, 1856
 Palaeobalistum gutturosum Arambourg, 1954
 Palaeobalistum libanicum Kramberger, 1895
 Palaeobalistum orbiculatum Blainville, 1818
 Palaeobalistum ponsortii Heckel, 1854
 Palaeobalistum rectidens Thurmond, 1974
 Palaeobalistum zignoi Blot, 1987

Distribution 
Fossils of Palaeobalistum have been found in:
Cretaceous
 Gramame Formation, Brazil
 Greenhorn Limestone, Colorado
 Antlers Formation, Oklahoma
 Glen Rose, Paluxy and Walnut Formations, Texas
 Haqel Limestone, Lebanon

Eocene
 Monte Bolca, Italy

See also 
 Prehistoric fish
 List of prehistoric bony fish

References 

Pycnodontiformes genera
Cretaceous bony fish
Paleocene fish
Eocene fish
Albian genus first appearances
Ypresian extinctions
Cretaceous fish of Asia
Paleogene fish of Europe
Paleogene Italy
Fossils of Italy
Cretaceous fish of North America
Cretaceous United States
Cretaceous fish of South America
Cretaceous Brazil
Fossils of Brazil
Fossil taxa described in 1818